Moussa Nassourou (born April 19, 1985 in Yaoundé) is a professional Cameroonian footballer currently playing for Cotonsport Garoua.

Trivia 
He began his profi career by his mother club Cotonsport Garoua in 2003.

External links
Profile and Pictures - www.cotonsport.com

1985 births
Living people
Cameroonian footballers
Coton Sport FC de Garoua players
Association football forwards